Dr. Sex is a 1964 American film directed by Ted V. Mikels.

The film is also known as Dr. S- in the USA.

Three sex researchers discuss their strangest cases.

Mikels said the film was originally called The Doctors and was based on an idea of Wayne Rogers, the producer. Rogers had been impressed by Mikels' first movie.

Cast
 Victor Izay as Dr. Sex
 Julia Calda as Dr. Lovejoy
 Ave Lezli
 Guido Lavotelli
 Mario Barco
 Bibo Tao
 Marsha Jordan as Julie
 Lolita Angeles
 Giovanni Duvalier
 Palva Itano
 Nina Lucia
 Chan Wingo

Soundtrack

References

External links
 
 

1964 films
1964 comedy films
1960s English-language films
American sex comedy films
Films directed by Ted V. Mikels
1960s American films